Bayswater Synagogue was an Ashkenazi-Orthodox synagogue located in Chichester Place, Paddington, London, near the Harrow Road. Built in 1863, as a branch synagogue jointly of the Great Synagogue and the New Synagogue, it was one of the original five synagogues that formed the United Synagogue in 1870. The original building was demolished in 1965 for construction of the Westway overpass and the Warwick Estate redevelopment.

History
From about 1820, many Jewish families had joined the westward expansion of London, placing them at an inconvenient distance from established synagogues whose wardens ("the Jewish City Fathers") required them to attend, even to the exclusion of private worship. Agitation commenced for a new synagogue, and "endless negative negotiations ensued between those who had moved into the Bayswater area and the authorities of the City synagogues." Support was gained from Chief Rabbi Nathan Marcus Adler and, after orderly formal proceedings, the Chichester Road site was selected and the foundation stone laid on 10 July 1862. On 21 February 1863 The Illustrated London News published an article on the new synagogue and, on 30 July 1863, the building was consecrated by the Chief Rabbi.

WWII bombing
During the Blitz of World War II, the board-room was destroyed by Luftwaffe bombing, with the loss of a portrait gallery of 19th-century communal leaders. On the same night (10 May 1941), both London's Great Synagogue and the 1870 Central Synagogue were also destroyed.

Notable rabbis
Dr Hermann Adler CVO preached at Bayswater Synagogue from 1864 to 1891, and served as Chief Rabbi of the UK from 1891 to 1911.
Sir Hermann Gollancz was the preacher from 1892 to 1922.
The distinguished Australian Raymond Apple AO occupied the pulpit in the synagogue's final years (1960–1965).

References

External links
 Apple, Raymond (Rabbi) End of an era at Bayswater The Jewish Chronicle, 28 December 1984
 Apple, Raymond (Rabbi) Valedictory Sermon – Bayswater Synagogue 8 May 1965, at OzTorah
 Bayswater Synagogue at AIM25 Archives collection, March 2010
 

Ashkenazi Jewish culture in London
Ashkenazi synagogues
Buildings and structures in the City of Westminster
Former synagogues in London
Synagogues completed in 1863
1965 disestablishments in England
Orthodox synagogues in England